Roccastrada is a comune (municipality) in the Province of Grosseto in the Italian region Tuscany, located about  south of Florence and about  north of Grosseto, between the Maremma plain and the Colline Metallifere.

Frazioni 
The municipality is formed by the municipal seat of Roccastrada and the villages (frazioni) of Montemassi, Piloni, Ribolla, Roccatederighi, Sassofortino, Sticciano and Torniella.

Government

List of mayors

References

External links

 Official website